The Indian Army during World War II fought on three continents Europe, Africa and Asia. They also had to supply formations for home service. This list details the Cavalry, Armoured and Infantry brigades formed by the Indian Army during World War II.

Cavalry brigades
1st (Risalpur) Cavalry Brigade
3rd (Meerut) Cavalry Brigade
4th (Secunderabad) Cavalry Brigade

Armoured brigades
50th Indian Tank Brigade
251st Indian Tank Brigade previously called 1st Indian Armoured and 251st Indian Armoured Brigade
252nd Indian Armoured Brigade previously called 2nd Indian Armoured Brigade
254th Indian Tank Brigade previously called 4th Indian Armoured and 254th Indian Armoured Brigade
255th Indian Tank Brigade previously called  5th Indian Armoured  and 255th Indian Armoured Brigade
267th Indian Armoured Brigade
268th Indian Armoured Brigade converted to 268th Indian Infantry Brigade October 1942

Motor brigades
1st Indian Motor Brigade designated, but actually formed as 1st Indian Armoured Brigade
3rd Indian Motor Brigade
10th Indian Motor Brigade

Anti aircraft brigades
1st Indian Anti-Aircraft Brigade
2nd Indian Anti-Aircraft Brigade
3rd Indian Anti-Aircraft Brigade

Parachute brigades
14th Indian Parachute Brigade
50th Indian Parachute Brigade
77th Indian Parachute Brigade

Infantry brigades
1st Indian Infantry Brigade 
2nd Indian Infantry Brigade
3rd Indian Infantry Brigade
4th Indian Infantry Brigade 
5th Indian Infantry Brigade 
6th Indian Infantry Brigade 
7th Indian Infantry Brigade 
8th Indian Infantry Brigade 
9th Indian Infantry Brigade 
10th Indian Infantry Brigade 
11th Indian Infantry Brigade 
12th Indian Infantry Brigade 
13th Indian Infantry Brigade
14th Indian Infantry Brigade
15th Indian Infantry Brigade 
16th Indian Infantry Brigade
17th Indian Infantry Brigade 
18th Indian Infantry Brigade 
19th Indian Infantry Brigade 
20th Indian Infantry Brigade 
21st Indian Infantry Brigade 
22nd Indian Infantry Brigade 
23rd Indian Infantry Brigade 
24th Indian Infantry Brigade
25th Indian Infantry Brigade 
26th Indian Infantry Brigade 
27th Indian Infantry Brigade 
28th Indian Infantry Brigade 
29th Indian Infantry Brigade 
30th Indian Infantry Brigade 
31st Indian Infantry Brigade
32nd Indian Infantry Brigade 
33rd Indian Infantry Brigade 
34th Indian States Forces Infantry Brigade 
36th Indian Infantry Brigade 
37th Indian Infantry Brigade 
38th Indian Infantry Brigade
39th Indian Infantry Brigade 
40th Indian Infantry Brigade 
43rd Indian Infantry Brigade (Lorried)
44th Indian Infantry Brigade
45th Indian Infantry Brigade
46th Indian Infantry Brigade
47th Indian Infantry Brigade 
48th Indian Infantry Brigade 
49th Indian Infantry Brigade 
51st Indian Infantry Brigade 
53rd Indian Infantry Brigade 
55th Indian Infantry Brigade 
60th Indian Infantry Brigade 
62nd Indian Infantry Brigade 
63rd Indian Infantry Brigade 
64th Indian Infantry Brigade 
71st Indian Infantry Brigade 
72nd Indian Infantry Brigade
73rd Indian Infantry Brigade
74th Indian Infantry Brigade 
75th Indian Infantry Brigade
77th Indian Infantry Brigade 
80th Indian Infantry Brigade 
84th Indian Infantry Brigade
88th Indian Infantry Brigade 
89th Indian Infantry Brigade 
90th Indian Infantry Brigade 
98th Indian Infantry Brigade 
99th Indian Infantry Brigade
100th Indian Infantry Brigade 
106th Indian Infantry Brigade 
109th Indian Infantry Brigade
111th Indian Infantry Brigade
113th Indian Infantry Brigade
114th Indian Infantry Brigade 
115th Indian Infantry Brigade
116th Indian Infantry Brigade 
123rd Indian Infantry Brigade 
150th Indian Infantry Brigade
155th Indian Infantry Brigade
161st Indian Infantry Brigade 
268th Indian Infantry Brigade

Named brigades
Bannu Brigade
Frontier Reserve Brigade
Gardai Brigade
Khojak Brigade
Kohat Brigade
Landi Kotal Brigade
Lushai Brigade
North Assam Indian Infantry Brigade
Nowshera Brigade
Peshawar Brigade
Quetta Brigade
Razmak Brigade
Risalpur Training Brigade
Thal Brigade
Wana Brigade
Zhob Brigade

References

 
Military units and formations of India in World War II
British Indian Army brigades